Ruth Kirk (1925 – April 19, 2018) was an American naturalist, author of 37 books, and filmographer. Along with her husband, Louis Kirk, she produced a nature-themed series, Kirk's Camera, for PBS, followed by twelve films before Louis Kirk's death in 1992.

External links
 Seattle Times obituary
 Ruth and Louis Kirk moving images, 1967–1991
 Interview with High Country News
 Washington State historical society article

1925 births
2018 deaths